Upper Two Medicine Lake is located in Glacier National Park, in the U. S. state of Montana. The lake is just east of the Continental Divide in the Two Medicine region of Glacier National Park. Upper Two Medicine Lake is in a cirque and surrounded by a number of peaks including Lone Walker Mountain, Mount Helen and Pumpelly Pillar.  Upper Two Medicine Lake is a  hike from the Two Medicine Store.

See also
List of lakes in Glacier County, Montana

References

Lakes of Glacier National Park (U.S.)
Lakes of Glacier County, Montana